Mohammad Rafiq Shinwari was a  singer and composer of Pashto music. Though he also tried his luck with Pashto poetry and wrote a few poems as well but it was his compositions for early Pashto movies that earned him a big name in this field. 

A disciple of Abdul Sattar Bacha, he was brought to Bacha's abode by his mother as a child in late 1940s from Nangarhar, Afghanistan. Rafiq Shinwari started his career as a Qawali singer of Radio Pakistan Peshawar Studio in 1961. Subsequently he became a household name among the Pashtun population of both Afghanistan and Pakistan in the 1970s and 1980s. He primarily sang the Sufi Poetry of Ameer Hamza Shinwari and Rahman Baba. Himself a Sufi by heart, Ustad Shinwari used to sing in a rare husky voice, which would leave his audience in a state of trance. As a music director some of his  Pashto movies include Orbal, Ehsan, Qaidi, Dameena, Topak Zama Qanoon, Iqrar, Naway Da Yawai Shpai, and Khana Badosh.

Out of his two sons, namely, Shaifq and Ghulam Ali, the later committed suicide in 1988 due to unknown reasons.

In 2004, the Rafiq Shinwari Ulasi award was established in his honour.

References

Links to some  audio and video songs 
Frontier Post article
Pashto Songs of Rafiq Shinwari
Sufi Songs of Rafiq Shinwari

Year of birth missing (living people)
Living people
Pashtun people
Pakistani people of Afghan descent
Pakistani male singers
Pashto-language singers
People from Nangarhar Province
People from Peshawar